Epilobium rigidum is an uncommon species of flowering plant in the evening primrose family known by the common names stiff willowherb and Siskiyou Mountains willowherb.

It is endemic to the Klamath Mountains of far northern California and southern Oregon, where it grows in dry, open areas in lower elevation coniferous forest habitat, often on serpentine soils.

This is a perennial herb forming upright clumps or mats of tough, peeling stems around a woody caudex. It bears bright pink flowers with heart-shaped petals up to 2 centimeters long flanked by pointed reddish sepals. The fruit is a hairy capsule up to 3.5 centimeters long.

External links
Jepson Manual Treatment
Photo gallery

rigidum
Flora of California
Flora of Oregon
Flora without expected TNC conservation status